The 1951 Akron Zips football team was an American football team that represented the University of Akron in the Ohio Athletic Conference (OAC) during the 1951 college football season. In its fourth and final season under head coach William Houghton, the team compiled a 1–8 record (1–3 against OAC opponents) and was outscored by a total of 252 to 116. Joe Mazzaferro and Paul Scarpitti were the team captains. The team played its home games at the Rubber Bowl in Akron, Ohio.

Schedule

References

Akron
Akron Zips football seasons
Akron Zips football